The Russian steam locomotive class Izhitsa (Ѵ) was a steam locomotive produced in Russia and the Soviet Union between 1908 and 1918, and between 1927 and 1931. The Russian letter Ѵ can be transliterated as Hy. On Russian and Soviet railways, these were the most powerful steam locomotives of type 0-8-0. They were designed by E. E. Noltein and had a 16-ton axle load.

Similar class
The Russian locomotive class Y (Ы) was similar but had a 15-ton axle load. In the period 1909–1916, 350 class Y (Ы) locomotives were built.

See also

 The Museum of the Moscow Railway, at Paveletsky Rail Terminal, Moscow
 Rizhsky Rail Terminal, Home of the Moscow Railway Museum
 Varshavsky Rail Terminal, St.Petersburg, Home of the Central Museum of Railway Transport, Russian Federation
 Finland Station, St.Petersburg
 History of rail transport in Russia

References

External links
The Moscow Railway Museum at Rizhsky Rail Terminal
 Report on a visit to the Varshavsky Rail Terminal

Railway locomotives introduced in 1908
Izhitsa
0-8-0 locomotives
Steam locomotives of the Russian Empire
5 ft gauge locomotives
D h2 locomotives